Raskenstam is a 1983 Swedish comedy film directed by Gunnar Hellström. The film tells the true story of a serial womanizer Gustaf Raskenstam (Anders Gustaf Eriksson) who seduced scores of women during World War II for financial gain. It featured Agnetha Fältskog from the famous Swedish band ABBA.

Cast
 Gunnar Hellström as Gustaf Raskenstam
 Agnetha Fältskog as Lisa Mattsson
 Lena Nyman as Malla af Tidaholm
 Harriet Andersson as Cecilia Andersson
 Thomas Hellberg as Karl-Erik Almkvist
 Inga Gill as Anna-Greta Kjellgren
 Yvonne Lombard as Märta Olin
 Lis Nilheim as Agnes Bengtsson
 Birgitta Andersson as Maja Jansson

References

External links
 

1983 films
1983 comedy films
Swedish comedy films
1980s Swedish-language films
1980s Swedish films